Larry A. Hoff (born 1951) is an American politician currently serving in the Washington State House of Representatives for the 18th legislative district.

Awards 
 2021 Legislator of the Year award. Presented by Washington Farm Bureau.

References

Living people
21st-century American politicians
Republican Party members of the Washington House of Representatives
1951 births